Sensini is a surname. Notable people with the surname include:

 Alberto Sensini (1909–1970), Argentine athlete
 Alessandra Sensini (born 1970), Italian windsurfer
 Kristian Sensini (born 1976), Italian film composer
 Roberto Sensini (born 1966), Argentine football manager and former player